The second USS Fleming (DE-32), and first ship of the name to enter service, was an  built for the United States Navy during World War II. While performing convoy and escort duty in the Pacific Ocean she was also able to sink one Japanese submarine and to shoot down several kamikaze planes that intended to crash onto her. For her military prowess under battle conditions, she was awarded four battle stars.

Construction and commissioning
She was launched on 16 June 1943 by Mare Island Navy Yard; sponsored by Mrs. W. E. Rutherford; and commissioned on 18 September 1943.

Service history
After training in the Hawaiian Islands, Fleming arrived at Tarawa on 15 January 1944 for local patrol and escort duty, as well as escort missions to Makin, Majuro, Funafuti, and Kwajalein through April. She returned to Pearl Harbor for a brief overhaul from 19 May – 7 June, then sailed for Eniwetok where she joined a convoy bound for Guam, arriving on 27 June. Fleming patrolled off Orote, and escorted merchantmen from Guam to Tinian and Eniwetok until 20 August, when she sailed to escort an attack transport to Saipan and Pearl Harbor.

Completing her assignment in the Mariana Islands operation, Fleming acted as target for submarines training in Hawaiian waters until 17 October, when she arrived at Eniwetok to begin 4 months of convoy escort duty between Eniwetok and Ulithi, the great base whose buildup was essential to the Iwo Jima and Okinawa operations.

On the night of 8 January 1945, guarding two tankers en route from Ulithi to Eniwetok, Fleming made a radar contact and began the five Hedgehog and depth charge attacks which sank the Japanese  just after midnight on 14 January.

In late-February and early-March, Fleming made escort voyages from Eniwetok to Saipan and Guam, then on 13 March arrived at Ulithi to prepare for the Okinawa assault. She sortied on 21 March in the screen of escort carriers providing air support for the initial landings on 1 April, and sailed with them until 17 April, when she departed the area to escort  to Guam for repairs. The escort carrier and destroyer escort sailed from Guam on 4 May to return to duty at Okinawa 4 days later.

On 20 May, still screening the escort carriers, Fleming splashed two of three Japanese planes which attempted to kamikaze or bomb her, driving the third away. Fleming continued to serve off Okinawa until 5 July, when she sailed for a west coast overhaul.

Still in the yard when the war ended, she was decommissioned on 10 November 1945, and sold for scrap on 29 January 1948.

Awards

References

External links
NavSource Online: Destroyer Escort Photo Archive – USS Fleming (DE 32)
 

Evarts-class destroyer escorts
World War II frigates and destroyer escorts of the United States
Ships built in Vallejo, California
1943 ships